The Phi11 Holin (φ11 Holin) Family (TC# 1.E.11) constitutes the Holin Superfamily I.

One characterized member of this family, pneumococcal EJ-1 phage holin (EJh; TC# 1.E.11.1.3), is a hydrophobic peptide of 85 amino acyl residues in length (aas) with 2 putative transmembrane segments (TMSs) displaying lethal inner membrane disruptive activity. The synthetic N-terminal TMS flanked by its N-terminal positively charged residues folds into a transmembrane α-helix that increases the membrane permeability. Oligomeric channels of various sizes form depending on the peptide to lipid ratio. By atomic force microscopy, peptide-induced membrane holes can be seen.

A representative list of proteins belonging to the φ11 holin family can be found in the Transporter Classification Database.

See also 
 Holin
 Lysin
 WikiGenes: holin
 Transporter Classification Database

Further reading 
 Bon, J.; Mani, N.; Jayaswal, R. K. (1997-07-01). "Molecular analysis of lytic genes of bacteriophage 80 alpha of Staphylococcus aureus". Canadian Journal of Microbiology 43 (7): 612–616. ISSN 0008-4166.PMID 9246739.
 Cerca, N.; Oliveira, R.; Azeredo, J. (2007-09-01). "Susceptibility of Staphylococcus epidermidis planktonic cells and biofilms to the lytic action of staphylococcus bacteriophage K". Letters in Applied Microbiology 45 (3): 313–317. doi:10.1111/j.1472-765X.2007.02190.x. ISSN 0266-8254. PMID 17718845.
 Curtin, John J.; Donlan, Rodney M. (2006-04-01). "Using bacteriophages to reduce formation of catheter-associated biofilms by Staphylococcus epidermidis".Antimicrobial Agents and Chemotherapy 50 (4): 1268–1275. doi:10.1128/AAC.50.4.1268-1275.2006. ISSN 0066-4804. PMC 1426991. PMID 16569839.
 Iandolo, John J.; Worrell, Veronica; Groicher, Kajetan H.; Qian, Yudong; Tian, Runying; Kenton, Steve; Dorman, Angela; Ji, Honggui; Lin, Shaoping (2002-05-01)."Comparative analysis of the genomes of the temperate bacteriophages φ11, φ12 and φ13 of Staphylococcus aureus 8325". Gene 289 (1–2): 109–118.doi:10.1016/S0378-1119(02)00481-X.
 Loessner, M. J.; Gaeng, S.; Wendlinger, G.; Maier, S. K.; Scherer, S. (1998-05-15). "The two-component lysis system of Staphylococcus aureus bacteriophage Twort: a large TTG-start holin and an associated amidase endolysin". FEMS Microbiology Letters162 (2): 265–274. ISSN 0378-1097. PMID 9627962.
 Martínez, Virginia; García, Pedro; García, José Luis; Prieto, María Auxiliadora (2011-07-01). "Controlled autolysis facilitates the polyhydroxyalkanoate recovery in Pseudomonas putida KT2440". Microbial Biotechnology 4(4): 533–547. doi:10.1111/j.1751-7915.2011.00257.x.ISSN 1751-7915. PMC 3815265. PMID 21418544.
 Seal, Bruce S.; Fouts, Derrick E.; Simmons, Mustafa; Garrish, Johnna K.; Kuntz, Robin L.; Woolsey, Rebekah; Schegg, Kathleen M.; Kropinski, Andrew M.; Ackermann, Hans-W. (2011-01-01). "Clostridium perfringens bacteriophages ΦCP39O and ΦCP26F: genomic organization and proteomic analysis of the virions". Archives of Virology 156 (1): 25–35.doi:10.1007/s00705-010-0812-z. ISSN 1432-8798.PMC 4127328. PMID 20963614.
 Xia, Guoqing; Wolz, Christiane (2014-01-01)."Phages of Staphylococcus aureus and their impact on host evolution". Infection, Genetics and Evolution 21: 593–601. doi:10.1016/j.meegid.2013.04.022.

References 

Holins
Protein families